Apsey Brook is a settlement on Random Island in Trinity Bay. The post office closed on September 13, 1966. In 1911 the population was 50.

See also
List of communities in Newfoundland and Labrador

References

Populated places in Newfoundland and Labrador